How You Sell Soul to a Soulless People Who Sold Their Soul??? is the tenth studio album by American hip hop group Public Enemy, released August 7, 2007 on Slam Jamz Recordings in the United States. Its release coincided with the 20th anniversary of their career. The album debuted at number 49 on Independent Albums chart, and it received generally positive reviews from most music critics, based on an aggregate score of 71/100 from Metacritic. Music critic Robert Christgau named How You Sell Soul to a Soulless People Who Sold Their Soul??? his second favorite album that didn't make Rolling Stone's Top 50 albums of 2007. In September 2012, the album finally entered the UK chart at number 199, followed by success of the top 5 single "Harder Than You Think" after it became the theme song to the British comedy talk show The Last Leg, which debuted the previous month as The Last Leg with Adam Hills.

Reception
Alternative Press (p. 176) - 3.5 stars out of 5 -- "Public Enemy remain fiercely independent and definitely seem revitalized."
The Wire (p. 75) - "[T]his is PE's tenth studio album in their 20th year and their blunt anti-artiste, anti-materialist stance carries serious weight."

Track listing
"How You Sell Soul to a Soulless People Who Sold Their Soul???" – 2:36
"Black Is Back" – 2:42
"Harder Than You Think" – 4:09
"Between Hard and a Rock Place" – 0:59
"Sex, Drugs & Violence" (feat. KRS-One) – 3:35
"Amerikan Gangster" (feat. E.Infinite) – 4:03
"Can You Hear Me Now" – 3:58
"Head Wide Shut" – 1:31
"Flavor Man" – 3:44
"The Enemy Battle Hymn of the Public" – 3:24
"Escapism" – 4:53
"Frankenstar" – 3:23
"Col-Leepin" – 3:58
"Radiation of a RADIOTVMOVIE Nation" – 1:10
"See Something, Say Something" – 3:46
"Long and Whining Road" – 4:24
"Bridge of Pain" – 3:07
"Eve of Destruction" – 4:15
"How You Sell Soul (Time Is God Refrain)" – 2:31

Personnel
Credits adapted from Allmusic.

 James Bomb (S1W) – group member  
 Chuck D – executive producer, group member, vocals  
 Flavor Flav - group member, vocals
 Bernie Larsen – guitar
 Khari Wynn – guitar  
 Michael Faulkner – drums 
 Pop Diesel (S1W) – group member   
 La Aerial Owens – vocals (background)  
 E. Infinite – choir, chorus  
 Gene Barge – saxophone
 Gebre Waddell - engineer
 Vincent Arbelet – photography  
 Le Bijoutier – photography  
 Mathieu Cavaliere – photography  
 Derek Welte – photography
 Gary G-Wiz – Producer  
 Mike "mGee" Gregoire – package design  
 Earle Holder – mastering   
 Walter Leapheart – liner notes  
 Amani K. Smith – associate producer, mixing, producer  
 Paul Stone – cover illustration  
 Andrew Williams – sound technician  
 Ron Wynn – liner notes

Chart performance

References

External links
 How You Sell Soul to a Soulless People Who Sold Their Soul??? at Discogs
 
 Album Review at South Florida Times

2007 albums
Public Enemy (band) albums